Erocha is a genus of moths of the family Noctuidae. The genus was erected by Francis Walker in 1854.

Species

 Erocha affinis Draudt, 1919
 Erocha albifrea Schaus, 1914
 Erocha dipsas Schaus, 1914
 Erocha dolens Druce, 1904
 Erocha elaina Zerny, 1916
 Erocha irrorata E. D. Jones, 1915
 Erocha leucodisca Hampson, 1910
 Erocha leucotelus Walker, 1865
 Erocha mummia Cramer, [1779]
 Erocha picta Draudt, 1919
 Erocha semiviridis Druce, 1903
 Erocha trita Druce, 1910

References
 
 

Agaristinae